The Tamil Eelam Army is a defunct  Tamil separatist group in Sri Lanka. It was founded by Panagoda Maheswaran. It was implicated in a bomb attack against a Sri Lankan airliner at Madras airport in India. It was disbanded after that incident.

See also
Sri Lankan Civil War
Tamil Eelam
List of Sri Lankan Tamil militant groups
Meenambakkam bomb blast

External links
Tamil Eelam Army chief held for Chennai blast
Other Tamil Eelam Militant Groups - TEA
Factions in the Sri Lankan Civil War
Tamil Eelam
Terrorist attacks on airports in Asia
Terrorist incidents in India in 1984
February 1984 events
1980s in Madras (city)
Improvised explosive device bombings in India
Building bombings in India